Timothy Andrea O'Neal (born August 3, 1972) is an American professional golfer who currently plays on PGA Tour Champions. His career also includes stops on PGA Tour Latinoamérica and Web.com Tour. He has won seven professional events on four continents: North America, Europe, Africa and South America. He is also known for his heartbreaking failures at PGA Tour Q School, where he missed earning a PGA Tour card by a single stroke on two occasions.

Amateur career
Prior to turning professional, O'Neal had a distinguished amateur career winning 16 college tournaments during his time at Jackson State University. He also won the Georgia Amateur Championship in 1997.

Professional career
For a very brief period early in his professional career, Will Smith sponsored O'Neal. O'Neal mainly played on U.S. mini-tours until receiving his Buy.com Tour card for the 2001 season (now named Web.com Tour), having missed out on a PGA Tour card at qualifying school by a single stroke following a double bogey on the final hole. O'Neal had a tough first season on the tour recording only two top-10 finishes ending 59th on the money list. In the following season, O'Neal only played three events on the Buy.com Tour and lost his tour card for the 2003 season.

In 2004, O'Neal once again missed out on a PGA Tour card at qualifying school by a single stroke but in doing so regained his playing rights for the Nationwide Tour for the 2005 season.

The return to the Nationwide Tour proved more successful and during the 2005 season O'Neal recorded his best finish to date, a second place at the 2005 Northeast Pennsylvania Classic. O'Neal maintained his good form throughout 2005 and 2006 finishing 44th and 36th on the tour money lists respectively. However his form dropped in 2007 and 2008 and he was unable to retain his card following the 2008 season.

O'Neal's career started to falter after losing his Nationwide Tour privileges. He also played on the Asian Tour, eGolf Professional Tour, the EPD Tour, and the Morocco-based Atlas Pro Tour. In 2011, O'Neal was asked to take over the Jackson State golf program, but he declined. He has yet to become a swing instructor.

In 2013, O'Neal took up playing rights on PGA Tour Latinoamérica and had instant success winning the Arturo Calle Colombian Open and the Abierto de Chile in his first season on the tour. These wins together assisted O'Neal to a third place finish on the PGA Tour Latinoamérica Order of Merit which was sufficient for him to regain his tour card for the 2014 Web.com Tour.

At age 42, O'Neal finally played his in first PGA Tour event after qualifying for the 2015 U.S. Open, where he missed the cut. O'Neal also played on the Advocates Pro Golf Tour, a professional golf tour that aims to open more playing opportunities for minorities. In 2022, O'Neal was one of five golfers to earn a PGA Tour Champions card through Q School.

Amateur wins
 1997 Georgia Amateur Championship

Professional wins (7)

PGA Tour Latinoamérica wins (3)

Alps Tour wins (1)

EPD Tour wins (2)

Other wins (1)
2018 Georgia Open

References

External links
 
 

American male golfers
PGA Tour golfers
PGA Tour Latinoamérica golfers
African-American golfers
Golfers from Savannah, Georgia
Jackson State Tigers and Lady Tigers
Living people
1972 births
21st-century African-American sportspeople
20th-century African-American sportspeople